The rivière à Lacaille (in English: Lacaille River) is a tributary of the south shore of the St. Lawrence River. This watercourse flows in the municipalities of Saint-Pierre-de-la-Rivière-du-Sud and Montmagny, in the Montmagny Regional County Municipality, in the administrative region of Chaudière-Appalaches, in Quebec, in Canada.

Toponymy 
The toponym Rivière à Lacaille was formalized on December 5, 1968, at the Commission de toponymie du Québec.

See also 

 List of rivers of Quebec

References 

Rivers of Chaudière-Appalaches
Montmagny Regional County Municipality